Naaummeedhu (English translation: Hopeless) is a 2001 Maldivian romantic film written and directed by Fathimath Nahula. Produced under Mapa, the film stars Reeko Moosa Manik, Yoosuf Shafeeu, Mariyam Nisha and Jamsheedha Ahmed in pivotal roles.

Plot
Ahmed Shifan confesses his love for his childhood friend, Zeyna who politely declines his proposal as she is already engaged. Heartbroken, Shifan leaves the country to focus on his studies abroad. Eight years later, Zeyna is happily married to Ayaz and they are blessed with an adorable daughter, Enash, whom she had named as per Shifan's request during the time he had confessed to her. Meanwhile, Shifan who is now a medical school graduate is still disheartened by the rejection and has remained single despite his father's attempts to set him up with other women. Eventually, he decides to give an honest attempt at trying to move on and agrees to date his father's friend's daughter Nathasha who has fancied him for a while.

Zeyna runs into her school friend, Noora and the two reconnect. Noora reveals to Zeyna that she is homeless as she had been kicked out of her home by her gold digging stepmother who wanted Noora out of the picture in order to seize her father's property. Out of pity, Zeyna invites Noora to stay her place until she gets back on her feet. However, the cunning Noora has had bad intentions all along as she wanted to marry a wealthy Male' man to spite her stepmother. She had been eyeing Ayaz for a while and thought of him as the perfect candidate; which was what prompted her to reconnect with Zeyna in the first place. Noora attempts to seduce Ayaz on multiple occasions and he finally gives in during a time Enash and Zeyna were not in town.

After seducing him, Noora compels Ayaz to marry her by feigning pregnancy. Ayaz panics and reluctantly marries Noora on the condition that she accepts Enash as her own daughter, to which Noora agrees. However, Noora has a condition of her own. Ayaz must divorce Zeyna in order to marry her as Noora does not want to be in a polygamous marriage. Zeyna eventually finds out that Ayaz has been cheating on her with Noora and confronts her, only to be taunted. Not wanting Ayaz to oust her out of his life, Zeyna calmly approaches Ayaz regarding the matter. Much to her surprise, Ayaz is completely indifferent to Zeyna's feelings and suggests that they get a divorce instead of apologizing to her. Zeyna despite objecting at first eventually agrees in order to keep him happy. The whole ordeal breaks her heart and Zeyna begs Ayaz to let her keep Enash with her as she had no family left. As Enash herself wishes to stay with her mother, Ayaz lets her go. Zeyna and Enash leave Ayaz's apartment in Male' in order to go back to her native island. However, this arrangement doesn't last long as Ayaz starts missing Enash. Noora suggests bringing Enash back to Male' even if it meant taking her from Zeyna by force; as she becomes sick of Ayaz whining about missing Enash. The two take a trip to Zeyna's island where Ayaz snatches Enash from Zeyna.

Things abruptly change for Ayaz and Noora after marriage. Noora claims that she had a miscarriage, has a short temper, and does not respect Ayaz or his daughter. She is also controlling towards Ayaz, but spends time with other men and frequently goes out with them, despite Ayaz's objections. In an attempt to make things a bit better, Ayaz takes both Noora and Enash to Guraidhoo, Noora's native island, where Enash sees Zeyna in the mental asylum who has lost her memory due to the shock of losing her daughter. Enash attempts to make conversation with her, but Zeyna cannot speak and just blankly stares at her.

Noora is speechless after seeing Enash with Zeyna and forcefully tries to take the child away before she could call her father. After seeing Noora take Enash away similar to how Ayaz had taken her, Zeyna regains her memory and calls out for her child, but soon faints on the spot. Enash tries to tell her father that she had seen her mother in the mental asylum, but gets dismissed by Noora who calls her a liar. As the mood of the trip had been ruined by this incident, the trio return to Male'. Ayaz gets curious and phones the asylum to find out that a person by his ex-wife's name was admitted to their facility and realizes that Enash had been telling the truth all along. However, he decides not to do anything about it.

Here it is revealed that Shifan, now a clinical psychiatrist volunteers for the same asylum part-time. He is shocked to discover that Zeyna is now in a mental asylum and decides to treat her privately and takes her back to Male' with him as her guardian. At this point, Shifan has also broken up with Nathasha after realizing that his feelings for Zeyna were still too strong to make room for anyone else.

Zeyna and Shifan become close once again as she tells her all the events that had gone down and starts crying once she mentions her daughter. Touched, Shifan vows to help her get the custody of Enash. Soon after, Shifan visits Ayaz and gives him a brief update on Zeyna and requests him to send Enash to Zeyna for a few hours as they had not seen each other in months. He also informs Ayaz that Zeyna planned to take the custody matter to court. Ayaz agrees to drop Enash off. Enash starts visiting Zeyna at Shifan's house on a semi-regular basis and warms up to him. Zeyna and Shifan's friendship slowly blossoms into love and they start sharing romantic moments with each other.

One day, Ayaz walks into Noora hitting Enash and learns how abusive she has been towards Enash throughout their marriage. He angrily divorces her and kicks her out, forcing Noora to take a boat back to Guraidhoo as her stepmother would not take her in either. Later on, Enash realizes how lonely her father is and asks him to get back together with Zeyna. Ayaz decides to talk to Zeyna and ask her if they could still work things out for the sake of their daughter. However, Zeyna has now fallen in love with Shifan and no longer has space in her heart for a man that cheated on her. Nevertheless, she agrees to stay civil with Ayaz for Enash's sake.

Dejected and having processed everything, Ayaz drops Enash off at Shifan's place one last time and announces that he has given full custody of Enash to Zeyna and tells her that going to the court is unnecessary. He also wishes Shifan and Zeyna a happy life and walks out, having acknowledged his mistake of taking a faithful partner that truly loved him, for granted.

Cast 
 Reeko Moosa Manik as Ayaz
 Yoosuf Shafeeu as Dr. Ahmed Shifan
 Mariyam Nisha as Zeyna
 Jamsheedha Ahmed as Noora
 Mariyam Enash Sinan as Enash
 Koyya Hassan Manik as Mahir
 Mariyam Nazima as Nathasha
 Mariyam Haleem as Noora's step-mother
 Ibrahim Rasheed (special appearance)
 Waleedha Waleed as Haseena (special appearance)

Soundtrack

References

2000 films
2000s romance films
Maldivian romance films
Films directed by Fathimath Nahula